Levi Day is a motorcycle racer from Australia. He is currently racing in the Ducati TriOptions Cup aboard a Ducati 959.

Career statistics
2009- 6th, Australian 125 Championship #57 Honda RS125R
2010- Australian 125 Championship #57 Honda RS125R
2011- 14th, Australian Supersport Championship #57 Suzuki GSX-R600
2012- 6th, Australian Supersport Championship #57 Suzuki GSX-R600
2013- 9th, British National Superstock 600 Championship #57 Kawasaki ZX-6R
2014- 8th, British National Superstock 600 Championship #57 Kawasaki ZX-6R
2015- 20th, British Supersport Championship #57 Kawasaki ZX-6R
2016- 29th, British Supersport Championship #57    Kawasaki ZX-6R
2017- 3rd,  Ducati TriOptions Cup #57    Ducati 848
2018- Ducati TirOptions Cup #57    Ducati 848

By season

Races by year

References

External links
 Profile on motogp.com

1989 births
Living people
Australian motorcycle racers
125cc World Championship riders